Clay Stone Briggs (January 8, 1876 – April 29, 1933) was a Democratic member of the United States House of Representatives from 1919 through his death in 1933.

Early life
Briggs was born in Galveston, Texas, on January 8, 1876. While a child, he went to both public and private schools. He attended University of Texas at Austin (where he was a member of the Nu Chapter of the Chi Phi Fraternity), Harvard, and graduated from Yale Law School.

Political career
Shortly after graduating college, he ran for the Texas House of Representatives and served there from 1907 to 1909. He was also a judge in the tenth district in Texas until 1919, when he became a member of congress. Briggs ran for Texas's 7th congressional district and served from March 4, 1919, until he died in Washington, D.C., in 1933. He is buried in Oakwood Cemetery in Syracuse, New York.

See also
 List of United States Congress members who died in office (1900–49)

External links

Biography in the Handbook of Texas Online

1876 births
1933 deaths
People from Galveston, Texas
University of Texas at Austin alumni
Harvard University alumni
Yale Law School alumni
Texas lawyers
Texas state court judges
Democratic Party members of the Texas House of Representatives
Democratic Party members of the United States House of Representatives from Texas
Burials at Oakwood Cemetery (Syracuse, New York)